Madhuri Banerjee (born 9 August 1975) is an Indian author, columnist and screenwriter. Her debut novel Losing My Virginity And Other Dumb Ideas sold over 40,000 copies. The writer of the successful Bollywood film, Hate Story 2, she has also worked with actress Karishma Kapoor on a non-fiction book called The Yummy Mummy Guide.

Banerjee was a columnist with Asian Age for two years and had a sex and relationship column in the Maxim magazine. Her awards include National Award for her documentary on women’s issues called Between Dualities. She has been the face of Revlon as their Relationship Expert for their campaign Choices.

Banerjee has been called by Cosmo magazine as the Carrie Bradshaw of India and has also been featured in the India Today Woman magazine twice in her six years as an author. A documentary was made about her by Dove as a Yahoo Fearless and Fab Woman, available on the Yahoo website. Shobhaa De calls her a Raja Ravi Verma painting and says about her debut novel, "Madhuri’s spunky, vivid take on negotiating sexual space in today’s insane social environment has won her several fans across the gender divide!"

Bibliography 

Losing My Virginity And Other Dumb Ideas (2011)
Mistakes Like Love And Sex (2012)
My Yummy Mummy Guide (2013) 
Advantage Love (2014) 
Scandalous Housewives (2014)
My Clingy Girlfriend (2015) 
Forbidden Desires (2016)
The Flaky Mummy (2016)

Filmography

See also
 List of Indian writers

References

External links 
 
 Madhuri Banerjee at Penguin India

1975 births
English-language writers from India
Lady Shri Ram College alumni
Indian women novelists
Living people
Indian women columnists
Indian columnists
Indian women screenwriters
21st-century Indian women writers
21st-century Indian writers
21st-century Indian dramatists and playwrights
21st-century Indian novelists
Screenwriters from Delhi
Novelists from Delhi
21st-century Indian screenwriters